Raúl Alfonso Allain Vega (born 11 November 1989 in Lima) is a Peruvian writer, poet, editor and sociologist.
He is a contributor to media such as América Latina en Movimiento, Rebelión, Pressenza, Crónica Popular and La Onda digital.

Life
Allain is the son of Manuel Alfonso Allain Santisteban and Patricia María del Pilar Vega González and grandson of Óscar Allain Cottera, an artist. In 2007 Allain matriculated at the National University of San Marcos to study sociology.

Career
Allain is the author of La cientificidad del consciente: Conjeturas (2011) and various texts that have been published in Latin American media. His texts have been published in the anthologies Abofeteando a un cadáver (2007), Poesía y narrativa hispanoamericana actual (2010), Lima: visiones desde el dibujo y la poesía (2010), Veinte poetas: muestra de poesía contemporánea (2010), El Papa Francisco en el Perú / Versos y prosa (2018) and Antología de poetas críticos (2019), among others.

As an editor, Allain has published anthologies on poetics, visual arts, and journalism Poéticas: selección de artes poéticas por poetas peruanos contemporáneos (2010), Suicidas Sub 21 (2010), Convergencias: muestra de poesía contemporánea (2011), Poiesis hispanoamericana: selección de poesía contemporánea (2012), Eros & Tánatos: poesía y arte contemporáneos (2012), ¡Yo no hice nada!: sobre la idiosincrasia peruana (2013), ¡Palaciego In Memoriam!: selección de textos de Humberto Pinedo (2018), among others.

The anthologies Suicidas Sub 21, Convergencias: muestra de poesía contemporánea y Poiesis hispanoamericana: selección de poesía contemporánea are registered in the Mario Vargas Llosa Library of the House of Peruvian Literature.

Suicidas Sub 21, a literary group that Allain created during university, brought together authors and poets, that were students from various universities. Among the authors who wrote for the group were Laura Rosales, Alejandro Mautino Guillén, Indira Anampa and Esteban Poole.

The House of the Peruvian Poet, chaired by the poet José Guillermo Vargas published the number RAÚL: El oficio sociológico en la poesía of the magazine La Casita Estrecha.

In December 2013, the proclamation of the scientific variables it raises is seen in the article "La educación peruana: una gran estafa" by the historian, poet and journalist Humberto Pinedo.

In November 2016, 'Análisis de Humberto Pinedo sobre la obra reciente de Raúl Allain' is published. 

In May 2021 he participates in the preparation of the dossier "Perú: un sueño postergado", published by the Latin American Information Agency (ALAI).

In June 2021, his article “Femicide and criminal policy” is published, translated by the Pressenza International Press Agency in the organization The Good Men Project. In February 2022, "Emotional Education: An Anthropological Approach" is also published. In May 2022, "Investigating Is the Essence of Journalism" is published. And in November 2022, "Humanising Work in the Age of 'Digital Slavery'".

He has been a columnist for magazines such as Voltaire Network. He is a columnist for the newspaper Expreso, the newspaper La Industria, the newspaper El Mercurio, the magazine Biografia, the magazine Lima Gris and Ssociólogos, a Spanish news outlet and sociology.

Awards and honors
In July 2019, Allain was awarded the "World Award for Cultural Excellence" from the Hispanomundial Union of Writers, chaired by Carlos Hugo Garrido Chalén. He subsequently received the "World Award for Sociological Excellence 'El Águila Internacional'". In December 2020 he was awarded the "World Award for Journalistic Excellence 'César Vallejo'". In June 2021 he was awarded the "World Award for Excellence in the Defense of Human Rights 'El Águila de Oro'". In June 2022 he was awarded the "World Award for Excellence in the Defense of Peace with Social Justice 'César Vallejo'". Allain currently directs the publishers, Río Negro.

encyclopedia fulfills the position of International Consultant for the Association of Victims of Organized Harassment and Electronic Torture (VIACTEC).

Bibliography

Article 
Hacia un Derecho Humano Público frente a la esclavitud digital, Diario Expreso. Peru, 2018 (Towards a Public Human Right against digital slavery)
Salud mental e inclusión social, Diario Expreso. Peru, 2019 (Mental health and social inclusion)
¿El Perú es un narcoestado?, Diario Expreso. Peru, 2019 (Is Peru a narco-state?)
Multilingüismo y pluriculturalidad en el Perú, Diario Expreso. Peru, 2019 (Multilingualism and multiculturalism in Peru)
La corrupción bajo el manto del escándalo, Diario Expreso. Peru, 2020 (Corruption under the cloak of scandal)
El racismo en el Perú – El cholo que cholea al «cholo», Ssociólogos. Spain, 2014 (Racism in Peru - The cholo who choles the «cholo»), reference for the page in Spanish and other languages Endophobia 
Maquinaciones electromagnéticas: Violación de los derechos humanos y la esfera privada, Ssociólogos. Spain, 2017 (Electromagnetic machinations: Violation of human rights and the private sphere)
Populismo y manipulación social, Ssociólogos. Spain, 2020 (Populism and social manipulation)
Hacia una sociología de Lima, Ssociólogos. Spain, 2020 (Towards a sociology of Lima)
Caso Solsiret: la violencia no tiene género, Ssociólogos. Spain, 2020 (Solsiret case: violence has no gender)
Crisis política en el Perú, Lima Gris. Peru, 2020 (Political crisis in Peru)
La economía a prueba de la pandemia del Covid-19, Lima Gris. Peru, 2020 (The economy tested by the Covid-19 pandemic)
El costo social de la corrupción, Lima Gris. Peru, 2021 (The social cost of corruption)
Perú elimina la inmunidad parlamentaria, Lima Gris. Peru, 2021 (Peru removes parliamentary immunity)
Vacunagate: la nueva «crisis moral» del Perú, Lima Gris. Peru, 2021 (Vacunagate: Peru's new «moral crisis»)

Anthology 
 Abofeteando a un cadáver, Bizarro Ediciones - Centro Cultural de España. Peru, 2007 (Slapping a corpse)
 Poesía y Narrativa Hispanoamericana Actual, Vision Libros - Lord Byron Ediciones. Spain, 2010 (Current Hispano-American Poetry and Narrative)
 Lima: visiones desde el dibujo y la poesía, Iván Fernández-Dávila. Editor. Peru, 2010 (Lima: visions from drawing and poetry)
 Veinte poetas: muestra de poesía contemporánea, I.F-D. Editor. Peru, 2010 (Twenty Poets: Contemporary Poetry Sample)
 Catástasis 2011, Ediciones OREM. Peru, 2011 (Catastasis 2011)
 Antología Décimo Aniversario de Lord Byron Ediciones, Liber Factory - Lord Byron Ediciones. Spain, 2013 (Tenth Anniversary Anthology of Lord Byron Editions)
 Mixtura Poética, Amantes del País Ediciones - Gaviota Azul Editores. Peru, 2013 (Poetic Mixture)
 Bienagradecido, Amantes del País Ediciones - Gaviota Azul Editores. Peru, 2017 (Grateful)
 El Papa Francisco en el Perú / Versos y prosa, Amantes del País Ediciones. Peru, 2018 (Pope Francis in Peru / Verses and prose)
 Antología de poetas críticos, Cisnegro. Mexico, 2019 (Critical Poets Anthology)

Anthology editor 
 Poéticas: selección de artes poéticas por poetas peruanos contemporáneos (poetry), Raúl Allaín. Editor. Peru, 2010 (Poetics: selection of poetic arts by contemporary Peruvian poets)
 Suicidas Sub 21 (poetry), Raúl Allain / Iván Fernández-Dávila. Editores. Peru, 2010 (Suicides Sub 21)
 Convergencias: muestra de poesía contemporánea (poetry), Editorial Río Negro. Peru, 2012 (Convergences: contemporary poetry show)
 Poiesis Hispanoamericana: selección de poesía contemporánea (poetry), Editorial Río Negro. Peru, 2012 (Poiesis Hispanoamericana: selection of contemporary poetry)
 Eros & Tánatos: poesía y arte contemporáneos (poetry and plastic), Editorial Río Negro. Peru, 2012 (Eros & Tánatos: contemporary poetry and art)
 Versolibrismo: poesía y arte contemporáneos (poetry and plastic), Editorial Río Negro. Peru, 2013 (Versesolibrismo: contemporary poetry and art)
 ¡Yo no hice nada!: sobre la idiosincrasia peruana (essays), Amantes del País Ediciones. Peru, 2013 (I didn't do anything !: about the Peruvian idiosyncrasy)
 ¡Palaciego In Memoriam!: selección de textos de Humberto Pinedo (journalism), JustFiction Edition. Latvia, 2018 (¡Palaciego In Memoriam!: a selection of texts by Humberto Pinedo)

Essay 
 La cientificidad del consciente: Conjeturas, Editorial Emooby. Portugal, 2011 (The Scientificity of the Conscious: Conjectures)

References

External links
 
 
 Reseña biográfica de Raúl Allain in the magazine La Onda digital

1989 births
Living people
Peruvian male poets
21st-century Peruvian poets
Peruvian sociologists
Peruvian columnists
Writers from Lima
National University of San Marcos alumni